Carnival is the second extended play (EP) by South Korean girl group Bvndit, released on May 13, 2020, by MNH Entertainment and distributed by Stone Music Entertainment.

Background
On April 28, MNH Entertainment confirmed that Bvndit will made a comeback with their second EP. On May 3, MNH Entertainment released the group's first promotional poster. On May 5, The second promotional poster was released. The following day, MNH Entertainment unveiled the track listing to the EP on their official social media accounts, revealing "Jungle" as the lead single.

Release 
The EP was released on May 13 through many Korean online music services, including Melon. For the global market, the album was made available on iTunes and Spotify. It was also released in physical format. It was also released in physical format.

Music video
On May 7, a first teaser for the music video of "Jungle" was released. On May 11, a second teaser for the music video was released. On May 13, the official music video of "Jungle" was released.

Track listing 
Credits adapted from track listing and Melon.

Charts

Release history

References

Korean-language EPs
2020 EPs